Vice Admiral Sir Robert Dymock Watson  (5 April 1904 – 3 February 1988) was a Royal Navy officer who went on to be Commander-in-Chief, South Atlantic and South America Station.

Naval career
Watson joined the Royal Navy in 1918. He served in World War II as Assistant Director of Plans on the Joint Planning Staff from 1944. After the War he was appointed to the 1st Destroyer Flotilla in the Mediterranean Fleet and then, in 1950, became Director of Plans at the Admiralty. He went on to be Commanding Officer of the aircraft carrier  in 1953 and Flag Officer, Flotillas in the Mediterranean Fleet in 1954. He was made Fourth Sea Lord and Chief of Supplies and Transport in 1955 and Commander-in-Chief, South Atlantic and South America Station in 1958. He made an official visit to Ladysmith before retiring in 1961.

He lived at Trebinshwyn in Brecon.

Personal life
His grandson is the actor and comedian Humphrey Ker, who based his 2011 Edinburgh Fringe show Dymock Watson: Nazi Smasher! on Watson's exploits in the Second World War.

References

|-

1904 births
1988 deaths
Royal Navy officers of World War II
Military personnel from Surrey
Royal Navy vice admirals
Knights Commander of the Order of the Bath
Commanders of the Order of the British Empire
Lords of the Admiralty